The 2013 East Coast Music Awards were held on March 10, 2013, to honour achievements in Atlantic Canada's music industry in 2012. The ceremony, the event's 25th anniversary, was held at the Cunard Centre in Halifax, Nova Scotia, and was hosted by singer-songwriters Rose Cousins and David Myles.

Cousins herself was one of the event's big winners, winning three awards for her album We Have Made a Spark and its single "Go First". The rock band The Stanfields won two awards, Group Album of the Year and the Fan's Choice Entertainer of the Year.

The event also featured a video tribute to country music legend Stompin' Tom Connors, who died just a few days before the event.

Nominees and winners

References

East
East